Ian Malcolm Dargie (born 15 November 1963) is a former Australian rules footballer who played for  and  in the Australian Football League (AFL) and  in the West Australian Football League (WAFL) during the 1980s and 1990s.

Biography
Dargie was born in England before emigrating to Australia as a child.

Playing career
Dargie began playing football for Sorrento Junior Football Club, later playing for Karrinyup Junior Football Club. After three years with North Beach in the Western Australian Amateur Football League he joined . After making his league debut at the start of the 1986 WAFL season, he played in three straight WAFL grand finals, winning premierships in 1986 and 1988.

In 1990 he moved back to his home state of Western Australia and joined the West Coast Eagles but managed just one game and spent most of the season playing with Subiaco. His performances for Subiaco were so impressive that he won a Sandover Medal the following year, in the process breaking the longest-ever Sandover "drought" by any WA(N)FL club dating back half a century to the legendary Haydn Bunton senior. In 1994 Dargie won the award again to join Bunton senior as the only players from the Lions to win it twice.

In 1995 Dargie joined Southport in the Queensland Australian Football League. In three seasons in Queensland he played in two premierships.

References

External links

1963 births
Living people
St Kilda Football Club players
West Coast Eagles players
Subiaco Football Club players
Sandover Medal winners
VFL/AFL players born in England
Australian people of English descent
Australian rules footballers from Western Australia
Southport Australian Football Club players